Yandi (Yandi-Khotar) is a rural locality (a selo) in Achkhoy-Martanovsky District, Chechnya.

Administrative and municipal status 
Municipally, Yandi is incorporated as Yandinskoye rural settlement. It is the administrative center of the municipality and is the only settlement included in it.

Geography 

Yandi is located on the right bank of the Netkhoy River.

The nearest settlements to Yandi are Katyr-Yurt and Valerik in the north-east, Gekhi in the east, Shalazhi in the south-east, and Stary Achkhoy in the west.

History 
In 1944, after the genocide and deportation of the Chechen and Ingush people and the Chechen-Ingush ASSR was abolished, the village of Yandi was renamed to Orekhovo, and settled by people from other ethnic groups. From 1944 to 1957, it was a part of the Novoselsky District of Grozny Oblast.

In 1957, when the Vaynakh people returned and the Chechen-Ingush ASSR was restored, the village regained its old name, Yandi.

Population 
 1990 Census: 2,339
 2002 Census: 1,510
 2010 Census: 2,488
 2019 estimate: 2,618

According to the results of the 2010 Census, the majority of residents of Yandi were ethnic Chechens.

References 

Rural localities in Achkhoy-Martanovsky District